Peter John Hollingworth  (born 10 April 1935) is an Australian retired Anglican bishop. Engaged in social work for several decades, he served as the archbishop of the Anglican Diocese of Brisbane in Queensland for 11 years from 1989 and was the 1991 Australian of the Year. He served as the 23rd governor-general of Australia from 2001 until 2003. He is also an author and recipient of various civil and ecclesiastical honours. In May 2003 Hollingworth became the third Australian governor-general to resign, after criticisms were aired over his conduct as Anglican Archbishop of Brisbane in the 1990s.

Early life
Born in Adelaide, South Australia, Hollingworth moved to Melbourne, Victoria, in 1940. After attending Lloyd Street and Murrumbeena primary schools he received his secondary-school education at Scotch College, Melbourne, then began a cadetship with BHP, an Australian mining company.

Education and career
Hollingworth was conscripted for national service in 1953 and, after basic training at the Royal Australian Air Force base at Point Cook, he began working in the chaplain's office and discerned a vocation to ordained ministry. After matriculating in 1954 he enrolled at the University of Melbourne, residing at Trinity College as a member of its school of theology. He graduated with a Bachelor of Arts degree in 1958 and a Licentiate of Theology in 1959.

On 6 February 1960 he married Kathleen Ann Turner, an obstetric physiotherapist, whom he had met while on National Service. The couple have three daughters.

Hollingworth was ordained as an Anglican priest in 1960. He became deacon-in-charge and then priest-in-charge of St Mary's North Melbourne, in a group ministry of the Anglican Inner City Mission within the Melbourne Diocesan Centre. In 1964 he joined the Brotherhood of St Laurence, an independent Anglican welfare organisation, as chaplain and director of youth and children's work, then as director of social policy and research. He completed a master's degree in social work and in 1980 was appointed executive director of the Brotherhood of St Laurence, where he served for 25 years and was involved in other associated community and welfare bodies.

He wrote several books about his work with the poor which became educational texts. As a public advocate on welfare policy he argued that "poverty should be looked at in terms of the structure of society rather than the individual case."

He was elected a canon of St Paul's Cathedral in 1980 and became the Bishop in the Inner City upon his consecration, 24 February 1985.

In 1989 he was elected the 8th Archbishop of Brisbane, where he continued his advocacy for the poor and underprivileged and supported the ordination of women.

He was chairman of the International Year of Shelter for the Homeless National NGO Committee and was named Australian of the Year for 1991, being described as "Australia’s foremost spokesman for social justice". He used his public profile to criticise government policy in relation to Aboriginal welfare and youth unemployment.

In 1998, he attended as an appointed delegate to the 1998 Australian Constitutional Convention.

Governor-General of Australia

On 22 April 2001 the Prime Minister of Australia, John Howard, announced that Queen Elizabeth II had accepted his advice to appoint Hollingworth as Governor-General of Australia upon the completion of Sir William Deane's term. He was the first Christian cleric to hold the post, though precedent existed at a state level where Aboriginal pastor Sir Doug Nicholls and Uniting Church minister Sir Keith Seaman had served as Governor of South Australia and Davis McCaughey had served as Governor of Victoria. On 29 June 2001, Hollingworth was sworn in as Governor-General of the Commonwealth of Australia and Commander-in-Chief of the Defence Force. As the governor-general is the chancellor and principal companion of the Order of Australia, Hollingworth was appointed a companion of the order (AC) on 29 June 2001.

Resignation
In December 2001, allegations were raised that, during his time as Archbishop of Brisbane, Hollingworth had failed to deal appropriately with sex abuse allegations made against a church teacher at Toowoomba Preparatory School. That month, the Brisbane Anglican diocese was ordered to pay $834,800 damages to the woman who had been found to have been sexually abused. Hetty Johnston, an advocate for child sex abuse victims, instigated a campaign calling for Hollingworth to resign. Hollingworth told the Australian media that, as a newly appointed archbishop at the time, he lacked the experience to handle the matter. He also said he had not believed that the case involved sexual abuse, but conceded he had not done enough to stop abuses occurring. Hollingworth subsequently apologised to the Toowoomba victim and released a formal statement condemning child sexual abuse but by February 2002, the Labor Opposition was calling for Hollingworth to be dismissed. Hollingworth stepped down from his positions as the Brisbane Lions' No 1 ticket holder, patron of Barnardo's, Kids First Foundation and the National Association for the Prevention of Child Abuse and Neglect.

Phillip Aspinall, Hollingworth's successor as archbishop, ordered an inquiry, which concluded that in 1993 Hollingworth had allowed a known paedophile to continue working as a priest. In May 2003, the report by the Diocese of Brisbane into the handling of the cases was tabled in the Queensland parliament by Premier of Queensland, Peter Beattie. On 8 May, Hollingworth issued a public statement denying allegations that he had raped a woman in the 1960s. Both the deputy prime minister, John Anderson, and the treasurer, Peter Costello, indicated in early May that Hollingworth should consider his position. After meeting with Howard on 11 May, Hollingworth stood aside. On 28 May 2003, he announced his resignation and his commission as governor-general was revoked as of 29 May 2003.

Royal Commission into Institutional Responses to Child Sexual Abuse
In 2015–2016, Hollingworth faced questions as part of the Royal Commission into Institutional Responses to Child Sexual Abuse in regards to his handling of abuse claims while he was Archbishop of Brisbane. He has apologised to victims for not pursuing their claims more rigorously. There is a case to defrock Hollingworth over allowing an “incurable” pedophile to remain in his position for 5 years after becoming aware of his abuse of children.

Honours
In 1976, Hollingworth was appointed an officer of the Order of the British Empire (OBE) and in 1988 he was appointed an officer of the Order of Australia (AO) for his work in church and community. In 2001 he was awarded the Centenary Medal and later the same year was promoted to companion of the Order of Australia (AC) upon his appointment as Governor-General taking effect. As well as these secular honours he was elected as a canon of St Paul's Cathedral in Melbourne in 1980. In 1991 he was named Australian of the Year and was included in the inaugural list of Australian Living Treasures in 1997.

On 21 May 2001, Hollingworth was awarded the Lambeth degree of Doctor of Letters (DLitt) by George Carey, the then Archbishop of Canterbury. He was awarded the doctorate in recognition of his research, publications, teaching and achievements in the fields of Christian social ethics, social welfare and poverty studies and episcopal leadership. In addition to this doctorate he already had six honorary doctorates from Australian universities.

Publications

References

External links
 Report by the Board of Inquiry

1935 births
Living people
Governors-General of Australia
Anglican archbishops of Brisbane
Assistant bishops in the Anglican Diocese of Brisbane
Australian republicans
Companions of the Order of Australia
Australian Officers of the Order of the British Empire
Australian of the Year Award winners
University of Melbourne alumni
People educated at Trinity College (University of Melbourne)
People educated at Scotch College, Melbourne
People from Adelaide
Recipients of the Centenary Medal
Delegates to the Australian Constitutional Convention 1998
Religious leaders from Melbourne